Tamao Shiwaku (塩飽 玉男, May 12, 1906 – December 15, 1990) was a Japanese runner. He competed at the 1936 Olympics in the marathon but did not finish the race.

He died in Sakaide, Kagawa on December 15, 1990.

References

1906 births
1990 deaths
Japanese male long-distance runners
Japanese male marathon runners
Olympic male marathon runners
Olympic athletes of Japan
Athletes (track and field) at the 1936 Summer Olympics
Japan Championships in Athletics winners